Mutual induction may refer to:

 Mutual inductance in physics
 Mutually inductive types in type theory